Donald Dale Pucket (December 15, 1915 – July 9, 1944) was a United States Army Air Forces officer and a recipient of the United States military's highest decoration—the Medal of Honor—for his actions in World War II.

Biography
Pucket joined the Army from Boulder, Colorado in 1942, and by July 9, 1944, was a first lieutenant piloting bombers with the 98th Bombardment Group. During a raid that day over Ploieşti, Romania, his airplane was badly damaged by anti-aircraft fire. He ordered his crew to abandon the craft, but three men were too frightened to parachute out. Pucket voluntarily stayed behind with the men and tried unsuccessfully to regain control of the plane. The aircraft crashed into a mountainside, killing all on board. Pucket was posthumously awarded the Medal of Honor a year later, on June 23, 1945.

Aged 28 at his death, Pucket was buried at Jefferson Barracks National Cemetery in Saint Louis, Missouri.

Awards and decorations
In addition to the Medal of Honor, Pucket also received the Distinguished Flying Cross, three Air Medals, and the Purple Heart.

Medal of Honor citation
First Lieutenant Pucket's official Medal of Honor citation reads:
He took part in a highly effective attack against vital oil installation in Ploesti, Rumania, on 9 July 1944. Just after "bombs away," the plane received heavy and direct hits from antiaircraft fire. One crewmember was instantly killed and 6 others severely wounded. The airplane was badly damaged, 2 were knocked out, the control cables cut, the oxygen system on fire, and the bomb bay flooded with gas and hydraulic fluid. Regaining control of his crippled plane, 1st Lt. Pucket turned its direction over to the copilot. He calmed the crew, administered first aid, and surveyed the damage. Finding the bomb bay doors jammed, he used the hand crank to open them to allow the gas to escape. He jettisoned all guns and equipment but the plane continued to lose altitude rapidly. Realizing that it would be impossible to reach friendly territory he ordered the crew to abandon ship. Three of the crew, uncontrollable from fright or shock, would not leave. 1st Lt. Pucket urged the others to jump. Ignoring their entreaties to follow, he refused to abandon the 3 hysterical men and was last seen fighting to regain control of the plane. A few moments later the flaming bomber crashed on a mountainside. 1st Lt. Pucket, unhesitatingly and with supreme sacrifice, gave his life in his courageous attempt to save the lives of 3 others.

See also

 List of Medal of Honor recipients for World War II

References

1915 births
1944 deaths
People from Boulder, Colorado
United States Army Air Forces officers
United States Army Air Forces pilots of World War II
United States Army Air Forces personnel killed in World War II
United States Army Air Forces Medal of Honor recipients
Recipients of the Distinguished Flying Cross (United States)
Recipients of the Air Medal
World War II recipients of the Medal of Honor
Aviators killed by being shot down
Aviators killed in aviation accidents or incidents in Romania
Military personnel from Colorado